Jabberwocky sometimes stylized as JBBRWCK is a French electropop band. It was formed in 2013 by three young French producers, Camille Camara, Simon Pasquer, and Emmanuel Bretou, still studying medicine and all originating from Poitiers, France. They had a number 2 hit in France with the single "Photomaton" featuring the vocals of Elodie Wildstars. The single and the music video were produced by the music collective Pain Surprises.

Discography

Albums

Singles

References

External links
Facebook

Musical groups from Nouvelle-Aquitaine